The Norman Anonymous (sometimes Anonymous of Rouen or Anonymous of York) is the name given to the author of a collection of treatises, the Tractatus Eboracenses, dealing with the relationship between kings and the Catholic Church, written c. 1100. The author, whose identity remains a mystery, offered some of the most strongly worded defences of royal authority and even superiority to the Catholic Church ever uttered in the medieval West. Surviving in just a single manuscript, the text is the only contribution made by the Anglo-Norman realm to the Investiture Controversy.

See also

Dominium mundi
A Dispute Between a Priest and a Knight
Proverbia Grecorum

References

Further reading
The Norman Anonymous is available in a facsimile edition, Der Codex 415 des Corpus Christi College Cambridge : Facs.-Ausg. d. Textüberlieferung d. Normannischen Anonymus ed. Karl Pellens (1977)
Sections are available in English translation in English Historical Documents II, ed. Douglas, pp. 675–8.
George Huntston Williams, The Norman Anonymous of 1100 AD: Towards the Identification and Evaluation of the so-called Anonymous of York, Harvard Theological Studies, xvii (1951)
K. Pellens, 'The tracts of the Norman Anonymous: Corpus Christi College Cambridge Ms. 415',. Transactions of the Cambridge Bibliographical Society (1965)

External links

  (Tractatus Eboracensis online)
 A digital edition of the text, including facsimiles

Catholicism in the Middle Ages
11th-century writers
12th-century writers
Anglo-Normans